Abakumovo is the name of several rural localities in Russia.

Modern localities
Abakumovo, Arkhangelsk Oblast, a village in Pavlovsky Selsoviet of Kargopolsky District in Arkhangelsk Oblast; 
Abakumovo, Kostroma Oblast, a village in Buyakovskoye Settlement of Susaninsky District in Kostroma Oblast; 
Abakumovo, Nizhny Novgorod Oblast, a village in Loyminsky Selsoviet of Sokolsky District in Nizhny Novgorod Oblast; 
Abakumovo, Novosibirsk Oblast, a settlement in Taskayevsky Selsvoiet of Barabinsky District of Novosibirsk Oblast; 
Abakumovo, Ryazan Oblast, a selo in Tyrnovsky Rural Okrug of Pronsky District in Ryazan Oblast; 
Abakumovo, Lesnoy District, Tver Oblast, a village in Bokhtovskoye Rural Settlement of Lesnoy District in Tver Oblast; 
Abakumovo, Rameshkovsky District, Tver Oblast, a village in Zaklinye Rural Settlement of Rameshkovsky District in Tver Oblast; 
Abakumovo, Staritsky District, Tver Oblast, a village in Staritsa Rural Settlement of Staritsky District in Tver Oblast; 
Abakumovo, Strashevichskoye Rural Settlement, Torzhoksky District, Tver Oblast, a village in Strashevichskoye Rural Settlement of Torzhoksky District in Tver Oblast; 
Abakumovo, Tredubskoye Rural Settlement, Torzhoksky District, Tver Oblast, a village in Moshkovskoye Rural Settlement of Torzhoksky District in Tver Oblast;

Alternative names
Abakumovo, alternative name of Abbakumovo, a village in Fedoskinskoye Rural Settlement of Mytishchinsky District in Moscow Oblast;

See also
Abbakumovo, several rural localities in Russia
Abakumov, Russian last name
Abbakumov, Russian last name